Gustavo Alonso from the ETH Zurich, Switzerland was named Fellow of the Institute of Electrical and Electronics Engineers (IEEE) in 2014 for contributions to data management and distributed systems.

Career
Alonso studied telecommunications-electrical engineering- at the Madrid Technical University (ETSIT, Politecnica de Madrid). A Fulbright scholar, he received a M.S. and Ph.D. in Computer Science at UC Santa Barbara. For a year after, he worked at the IBM Almaden Research Center before joining ETHZ.

References 

Fellow Members of the IEEE
Living people
University of California, Santa Barbara alumni
Year of birth missing (living people)